Mountain Township may refer to:

Canada
 Mountain Township, Ontario, now part of North Dundas

United States

Arkansas
 Mountain Township, Cleburne County, Arkansas, in Cleburne County, Arkansas
 Mountain Township, Faulkner County, Arkansas, in Faulkner County, Arkansas
 Mountain Township, Franklin County, Arkansas, in Franklin County, Arkansas
 Mountain Township, Howard County, Arkansas, in Howard County, Arkansas
 Mountain Township, Logan County, Arkansas, in Logan County, Arkansas
 Mountain Township, Pike County, Arkansas, in Pike County, Arkansas
 Mountain Township, Polk County, Arkansas, in Polk County, Arkansas
 Mountain Township, Scott County, Arkansas, in Scott County, Arkansas
 Mountain Township, Van Buren County, Arkansas, in Van Buren County, Arkansas
 Mountain Township, Yell County, Arkansas, in Yell County, Arkansas

Illinois
 Mountain Township, Saline County, Illinois

Missouri
 Mountain Township, Barry County, Missouri
 Mountain Township, McDonald County, Missouri

North Carolina
 Mountain Township, Jackson County, North Carolina, in Jackson County, North Carolina

Township name disambiguation pages